Hodge Jones & Allen is a London solicitors founded in September 1977 by Henry Hodge, Peter Jones, and Patrick Allen,  specialising in legal aid work and favouring radical causes.

History 
In 1976, Patrick Allen, an articled clerk at Mayfair solicitors, Offenbach & Co, was discussing the possibility of setting up a new law firm with colleague and solicitor Peter Jones. They looked for a third partner and were introduced to Henry Hodge then head of the Citizens Rights office at CPAG.

Hodge found a willing bank manager, Bert Enright of the Midland Bank, Camden Town who agreed to lend each partner £3500 on overdraft subject to parental guarantees. They found premises above a tailor's shop on Camden High Street. In August 1977 Allen completed his Part 2 Law Society exams at Alexandra Palace and joined Hodge at the new office which they painted . In September 1977 Jones arrived and they opened for business. Bert sent the first client who needed advice on a bank guarantee. Their first £5 fixed fee was framed and put on the wall of Henry's office– later stolen by a client.

The firm was founded specifically to use the law and a flourishing legal aid scheme to provide the means for vulnerable clients to assert or defend their rights.

The firm first had offices on Camden High Street, chosen because they were in an area of social deprivation and not far from the law courts. Initially, the firm specialised in criminal defence, family law, housing, private client work and general litigation which was mostly funded by legal aid. It went on to develop teams in personal injury, clinical negligence and multi-party work.

The firm expanded steadily each year and in November 1997 moved off the High Street to Twyman House, Camden Road, with 75 employees. The offices were opened by Cherie Booth, who accepted briefs from the firm in her early career. The first website was launched shortly after the move. The firm now employs over 230 people at its offices on North Gower Street, Camden and has  47 partners.

In December 2018, Hodge Jones & Allen Solicitors became first law firm to convert its business model to create a 100% employee owned trust (EOT).  Hodge Jones & Allen Solicitors Limited trade and run in the same way as Hodge Jones & Allen Solicitors LLP, but 100 per cent of the shares of the new limited company will be owned by the Trust rather than the current members of the LLP.

Notable cases

Sexual offences
 HJA's partner Nigel Richardson acted for Michael Peacock in a landmark obscenity trial that set a test of the Obscene Publications Act 1959.

Disasters 
 Victims of the Marchioness ferry disaster
 Victims of the King's Cross fire

Crime 

 Represented Extinction Rebellion activists.
 Represented the Stansted 15 protesters in their fight to have terror convictions overturned for stopping a Home Office deportation flight.
 Represented over 100 activists who were core participants in the Undercover Policing Inquiry.
 Represented the Colston Four, accused of criminal damage for toppling a statue of Edward Colston in Bristol during anti-racism protests in 2020.

Health 

 Healthcare workers, children and people in ‘at risk groups’ who alleged they had narcolepsy due to the 2009-10 pandemic H1N1 swine flu vaccine ‘Pandemrix’
 Families of girls alleged to have been harmed by Cervarix, the cervical cancer vaccine.
 Gulf War veterans who claimed that they suffered from Gulf War Syndrome. The case collapsed in 2004.

Military 
 The family of Scottish soldier Private Jason Smith, who died of heatstroke in Iraq in August 2003.
 The family of Private Phillip Hewett, who died in Iraq in July 2005 when the Snatch Land Rover he was travelling in was hit by a roadside bomb.

Property Dispute 

 Legal challenge against HS2 Ltd on behalf of Hero Granger-Taylor, a Camden resident.

Personal Injury 

 Represented the Al-Najjr family who suffered life-changing injuries in a hammer attack at the Cumberland Hotel.

Civil liberties & Human Rights 
 Miners during the 1980's strike
 Winston Silcott, who was accused and acquitted of the murder of Keith Blakelock during the 1985 Broadwater Farm riot.
Ella Adoo-Kissi-Debrah inquest – Ella, a 9-year-old girl who lived close to the heavily polluted South Circular Road in Lewisham, became the first person to have air pollution on her death certificate.
 Vincent and Michael Hickey, two of the Bridgewater Four.
 Members of UK Uncut who were arrested in Fortnum & Mason during a 2011 protest.
 Neville Lawrence, the father Stephen Lawrence, who was murdered in a racist attack.
 A woman arrested and denied bail for allegedly handling stolen goods after the 2011 England riots.
 A policy to not represent defendants in rape cases where the defence put forward was that the woman consented was criticised and quickly dropped.

Family law 
 Philippa Vaughan, who successfully claimed a divorce settlement twenty-five years after her divorce.

Housing law 
 Representing residents of Grenfell Tower.
Jayesh Kunwardia, head of the Housing team was successful in a Supreme Court challenge against the decision of Westminster City Council to accommodate a homeless family far from their home borough.

References

External links 
 
 Hodge Jones & Allen Limited, The Legal 500
 Hodge Jones & Allen Limited, Chambers & Partners

Law firms based in London
Law firms established in 1977
Companies based in the London Borough of Camden